Futabasaurus is a genus of plesiosaur from the Late Cretaceous of Fukushima, Japan. It was described and named in 2006, and was assigned to the family Elasmosauridae. The genus contains one species, F. suzukii.

Description
 
It can be distinguished from other elasmosaurids by the following characteristics: there is a long distance between the eye sockets and nostrils; the interclavicles and clavicles are fused, and the anterior edge is bent; the humerus is relatively long; and the femora are slim and show prominent muscle scars.

Discovery and naming
Futabasaurus is the first elasmosaurid found in Japan. It was originally known as either "Wellesisaurus sudzuki" or "Futaba-ryu" before publication. The type specimen of Futabasaurus was found in the Irimazawa Member of the Tamayama Formation, in the Futaba Group of Fukushima Prefecture, Japan. The rocks in which it were found date to the Inoceramus amakusensis zone of the early Santonian. The fossils were found by Tadashi Suzuki, then a high school student. Many of the bones of the type specimen show signs of apparent scavenging or predation by sharks.

The genus Futabasaurus was named after the Futaba Group, in which it was discovered; the species name is derived from the family name of its discoverer, Suzuki. The name "Futabasaurus" has also been used for an unrelated theropod dinosaur, also from the Late Cretaceous of Japan. However, this dinosaur was not officially named, and remains a nomen nudum.

Classification

The following cladogram shows the placement of Futabasaurus within Elasmosauridae following an analysis by Rodrigo A. Otero, 2016:

See also

 List of plesiosaur genera
 Timeline of plesiosaur research

References

External links
Futabasaurus at Dinosaurier-Web (German)

Late Cretaceous plesiosaurs
Fossil taxa described in 2006
Plesiosaurs of Asia
Extinct animals of Japan
Elasmosaurids
Fossils of Japan
Sauropterygian genera
Santonian life